You're Under Arrest may refer to:
You're Under Arrest (manga), a manga and anime franchise created by Kōsuke Fujishima
You're Under Arrest (Miles Davis album), 1985
You're Under Arrest (Serge Gainsbourg album), 1987
"You're Under Arrest", a saying that is used when arresting a criminal, most often used by the police